Black Eyes was an American post-punk band from Washington, D.C., United States, that existed from August 2001 to March 2004, disbanding two months prior to the release of their second album, Cough.  Its members included Dan Caldas, Jacob Long, Mike Kanin, Daniel Martin-McCormick and Hugh McElroy.

History
Prior to releasing the first album, Black Eyes released a 2-song 7" EP and a split EP of "Someone Has His Fingers Broken" entitled "Have Been Murdered Again."  Black Eyes' self-titled debut album was released on April 15, 2003, through Dischord Records. Most tracks featured the band's trademark dual vocals from bass guitarist Hugh McElroy and guitarist Daniel Martin-McCormick, as well as two full drum kits and the usage of horns and synthesizers.

After extensive touring with Q and Not U, the band broke up just before its second album, Cough, was released on June 1, 2004, also through Dischord Records. For this album, the band incorporated frenzied brass instruments into its sound, pushing further into free-jazz territory.

Black Eyes disbanded after a final show at The Black Cat in Washington, D.C.  All of the band's former members have since moved on to pursue other projects, such as Ital, Earthen Sea, Marriage, Hand Fed Babies, Sentai and Mi Ami. Hugh McElroy has become fully immersed in his DIY record label, Ruffian Records.

On November 15, 2022, it was announced that the band would reunite for three shows in April 2023, to celebrate the 20th anniversary of their debut album.

Black Eyes discography

Black Eyes (2003) – track listing
 "Someone Has His Fingers Broken"
 "A Pack of Wolves"
 "Yes, I Confess"
 "On the Sacred Side"
 "Nine"
 "Speaking in Tongues"
 "Deformative"
 "King's Dominion"
 "Day Turns Night"
 "Letter to Raoul Peck"

''Cough'' (2004) – track listing
 "Cough, Cough"
 "Eternal Life"
 "False Positive"
 "Drums"
 "Scrapes and Scratches"
 "Fathers of Daughters"
 "Holy of Holies"
 "Commencement"
 "Spring Into Winter"
 "Another Country"
 "Meditation"

Shut Up, I Never - track listing
 "Some Boys"
 "Shut Up, I Never"
 "Have Been Murdered Again"

References

External links
Reviews

Review of Black Eyes at Pitchfork Media
Review of Cough at Pitchfork Media

Review of Black Eyes at Dusted Reviews
Review of Cough at Dusted Reviews

American post-hardcore musical groups
Dischord Records artists
Musical groups from Washington, D.C.